Sayed Hussein Anwari (1956 – 5 July 2016) was a politician in Afghanistan. He was a Shia and came from Mohammed Asef Mohseni's Harakat-e Islami (Islamic Movement party).

Early life
Anwari, an ethnic Hazara of the Sayyed branch, was born in Shekh Ali District of Parwan Province and was educated as a teacher in Kabul.

Career
He was Minister of Social Affairs and Labor from 1992 to 1995. He fought with the Northern Alliance from 1995 to 2001 against the Taliban and became chief military commander of Harrakat-e-Islami in Afghanistan during that time.

Minister of Agriculture
After Kabul was taken by the Northern Alliance in 2001, he was appointed as the Agriculture minister in Afghanistan's transitional government.

During his tenure his personal interest was in the cultivation of roses. As Minister he worked to develop agribusiness in the forestry, stone fruit and pomegranate sector. The established business of grapes and certain vegetables were afforded support from assorted NGOs. He encouraged and supported the establishment by an American company, Permanente Corporation of California, of the creation of three major tree farms and nurseries in the Kabul area that grew millions of root stock trees for stone fruit, fruiting pomegranate orchard trees and millions of Pinus Alderica (Afghan Pine) seedlings for eventual transplanting into the mountains denuded by prior years of war and over cutting. With his endorsement of the activities of Permanente Corporation, Afghan Development Company was founded to carry on the work of the private sector under his Ministerial administration.

The participants in the Permanente led consortium included Sunsweet Growers, Burchell Nurseries, Seminis Seeds, Netafim Irrigation, Langer's Juice, UC Davis agriculture extension, and professors at Cornell University offices for scientific work related to cultivation of Afghan native species and the reintroduction of plant materials held for over 70 years in Davis, California and the protection of plant materials by the establishment of laws and regulations relating to import and export of agribusiness products. Anwari tried, but did not get any meaningful Transitional Government financial support for his ministerial agribusiness activities. The multitudes of NGOs and global international government organizations including USAID and the USA Commerce Department and Agriculture Departments failed to fully support his initiatives.

Deferring instead to OMB rules that prohibited funding mechanisms for countries in war zones, many USDA, CCC, ExImBank programs became unavailable to Afghanistan businesses despite Anwari's efforts from Afghanistan, and Permanente's efforts from the US, to achieve the contrary.  Of the millions of dollars of US government economic aid spent ostensibly in Afghanistan on agriculture development most funds had little impact on the Afghan agricultural economy and remained inside the Washington DC beltway spent in the form of reports and studies.

No real development programs on the ground in Afghanistan were instituted. Anwari provided trees for Afghan Tree Week (a May Day ceremonial occasion) by encouraging Permanente to donate seedlings for planting in nurseries and tree farms around the countryside.

Afghanistan was not permitted to draw on any portion of the nearly $50 million in funds earmarked for agribusiness development by the Asian Development Bank who instead stood on the sidelines and held back funds for agriculture development despite Anwari's efforts to gain financial support and push for broader economic development in the agriculture sector. In fact, Anwari's budget was so thin that he paid by himself for the installation of sanitary facilities in  Ministerial offices.

Governorship and Parliament
In June 2005 he was appointed governor of Herat province where he served until 2009. He was elected to the Wolesi Jirga as a member from Kabul in the 2010 elections.  He had previously been elected as an MP from Kabul in the 2005 elections.

References

1956 births
2016 deaths
Hazara politicians
Governors of Herat Province
Islamic Movement of Afghanistan politicians